Perittia is a genus of moths of the family Elachistidae.

Species

Perittia aganopa (Meyrick, 1911)
Perittia andoi Inoue et al., 1982
Perittia antauges Kaila, 2011
Perittia biloba Sruoga, 1990
Perittia carlinella (Walsingham, 1908)
Perittia cinereipunctella Turati, 1930
Perittia constantinella (Rebel, 1901)
Perittia cygnodiella (Busck, 1921)
Perittia daleris Kaila, 2011
Perittia deroga Kaila, 2011
Perittia echiella (de Joannis, 1902)
Perittia eremonoma (Braun, 1948)
Perittia ernsti Kaila, 2000
Perittia eselkopensis Mey, 2011
Perittia farinella (Thunberg, 1794)
Perittia fraudatrix Kaila, 2000
Perittia granadensis (Traugott-Olsen, 1995)
Perittia herrichiella (Herrich-Schäffer, 1855)
Perittia huemeri (Traugott-Olsen, 1990)
Perittia infumata (Meyrick, 1914) (previously in Phthinostoma)
Perittia junnilaisella Kaila, 2009
Perittia karadaghella Sinev & Budashkin, 1991
Perittia lonicerae (Zimmerman and Bradley, 1950)
Perittia mastodon Kaila, 2000
Perittia metaxea (Kaila, 1995)
Perittia minitaurella Kaila, 2009
Perittia morgana Kaila, 2000
Perittia mucronata (Parenti, 2001)
Perittia nephele Kaila, 2000
Perittia nimbifera (Meyrick, 1913)
Perittia obscurepunctella (Stainton, 1848)
Perittia ochrella (Sinev, 1992)
Perittia pachyzona (Meyrick, 1921) (previously in Phthinostoma)
Perittia passula Kaila, 1995
Perittia patagonica Kaila, 2000
Perittia petrosa Sruoga, 1992
Perittia piperatella (Staudinger, 1859)
Perittia punatensis Kaila, 2000
Perittia ramona Kaila, 2000
Perittia ravida Kaila, 2009
Perittia regina Kaila, 2000
Perittia secutrix Meyrick, 1914
Perittia sepulchrella (Stainton, 1872)
Perittia serica (Kaila, 1995)
Perittia sibirica Sinev, 1992
Perittia smaragdophanes (Meyrick, 1932)
Perittia spermatopis (Meyrick, 1933)
Perittia tectusella Sruoga, 1997
Perittia tucumana Kaila, 2000
Perittia unicolorella Sinev, 1992
Perittia unifasciella Sinev, 1992
Perittia weberella Whitebread, 1984

Former species
Perittia falciferella Sruoga & J. de Prins, 2009
Perittia gnoma Sruoga & J. de Prins, 2009
Perittia olelella Westwood in Wood, 1854
Perittia podonosmella (Amsel, 1953)
Perittia spatulata Sruoga & J. de Prins, 2009
Perittia tantilla Sruoga & J. de Prins, 2009

References

  (1999): Phylogeny and classification of the Elachistidae s.s. (Lepidoptera: Gelechioidea); Phylogeny and classification. Retrieved 2 November 2010.
 , 1995: A revision of the North American Perittia (= Onceroptila), with first nearctic records of the genus Mendesia (Elachistidae). Journal of the Lepidopterists' Society 49 (3): 208-222. Full article: 
 , 2000: A review of the South American Elachistidae s. str. (Lepidoptera: Gelechioidea), with descriptions of 15 new species. Steenstrupia 25 (2): 159-193.
  2009: Notes on the genus Perittia of the West Palaearctic region with descriptions of three new species (Lepidoptera: Elachistidae). Zootaxa, 2230: 16-28. Abstract & excerpt
 , 2011: New and little known species of Lepidoptera of southwestern Africa. Esperiana Buchreihe zur Entomologie Memoir 6: 146-261.
 ;  2009: The Elachistinae (Lepidoptera: Elachistidae) of Kenya with descriptions of eight new species. Zootaxa, 2172: 1-31. Abstract & excerpt
 , 1984: A new species of Perittia Stainton from Switzerland (Elachistidae). Nota Lepidopterologica 7 (3): 271-281.

Elachistidae
Taxa named by Henry Tibbats Stainton